In numerical analysis, Newton's method, also known as the Newton–Raphson method, named after Isaac Newton and Joseph Raphson, is a root-finding algorithm which produces successively better approximations to the roots (or zeroes) of a real-valued function. If the function satisfies sufficient assumptions and the initial guess is close, then

The process is repeated as

until a sufficiently precise value is reached. The number of correct digits roughly doubles with each step. This algorithm is first in the class of Householder's methods, succeeded by Halley's method. The method can also be extended to complex functions and to systems of equations.

Description

The idea is to start with an initial guess, then to approximate the function by its tangent line, and finally to compute the -intercept of this tangent line. This -intercept will typically be a better approximation to the original function's root than the first guess, and the method can be iterated.

If the tangent line to the curve  at  intercepts the x-axis at  then the slope is

.

Solving for  gives

We start the process with some arbitrary initial value . (The closer to the zero, the better. But, in the absence of any intuition about where the zero might lie, a "guess and check" method might narrow the possibilities to a reasonably small interval by appealing to the intermediate value theorem.) The method will usually converge, provided this initial guess is close enough to the unknown zero, and that . Furthermore, for a zero of multiplicity 1, the convergence is at least quadratic (see rate of convergence) in a neighbourhood of the zero, which intuitively means that the number of correct digits roughly doubles in every step. More details can be found in the analysis section below.

Householder's methods are similar but have higher order for even faster convergence. However, the extra computations required for each step can slow down the overall performance relative to Newton's method, particularly if  or its derivatives are computationally expensive to evaluate.

History
The name "Newton's method" is derived from Isaac Newton's description of a special case of the method in De analysi per aequationes numero terminorum infinitas (written in 1669, published in 1711 by William Jones) and in De metodis fluxionum et serierum infinitarum (written in 1671, translated and published as Method of Fluxions in 1736 by John Colson). However, his method differs substantially from the modern method given above. Newton applied the method only to polynomials, starting with an initial root estimate and extracting a sequence of error corrections. He used each correction to rewrite the polynomial in terms of the remaining error, and then solved for a new correction by neglecting higher-degree terms. He did not explicitly connect the method with derivatives or present a general formula. Newton applied this method to both numerical and algebraic problems, producing Taylor series in the latter case.

Newton may have derived his method from a similar, less precise method by Vieta. A special case of Newton's method for calculating square roots was known since ancient times and is often called the Babylonian method.

Newton's method was used by 17th-century Japanese mathematician Seki Kōwa to solve single-variable equations, though the connection with calculus was missing.

Newton's method was first published in 1685 in A Treatise of Algebra both Historical and Practical by John Wallis. In 1690, Joseph Raphson published a simplified description in Analysis aequationum universalis. Raphson also applied the method only to polynomials, but he avoided Newton's tedious rewriting process by extracting each successive correction from the original polynomial. This allowed him to derive a reusable iterative expression for each problem. Finally, in 1740, Thomas Simpson described Newton's method as an iterative method for solving general nonlinear equations using calculus, essentially giving the description above. In the same publication, Simpson also gives the generalization to systems of two equations and notes that Newton's method can be used for solving optimization problems by setting the gradient to zero.

Arthur Cayley in 1879 in The Newton–Fourier imaginary problem was the first to notice the difficulties in generalizing Newton's method to complex roots of polynomials with degree greater than 2 and complex initial values. This opened the way to the study of the theory of iterations of rational functions.

Practical considerations
Newton's method is a powerful technique—in general the convergence is quadratic: as the method converges on the root, the difference between the root and the approximation is squared (the number of accurate digits roughly doubles) at each step. However, there are some difficulties with the method.

Difficulty in calculating the derivative of a function
Newton's method requires that the derivative can be calculated directly. An analytical expression for the derivative may not be easily obtainable or could be expensive to evaluate. In these situations, it may be appropriate to approximate the derivative by using the slope of a line through two nearby points on the function. Using this approximation would result in something like the secant method whose convergence is slower than that of Newton's method.

Failure of the method to converge to the root
It is important to review the proof of quadratic convergence of Newton's method before implementing it. Specifically, one should review the assumptions made in the proof. For situations where the method fails to converge, it is because the assumptions made in this proof are not met.

Overshoot
If the first derivative is not well behaved in the neighborhood of a particular root, the method may overshoot, and diverge from that root. An example of a function with one root, for which the derivative is not well behaved in the neighborhood of the root, is

for which the root will be overshot and the sequence of  will diverge. For , the root will still be overshot, but the sequence will oscillate between two values. For , the root will still be overshot but the sequence will converge, and for  the root will not be overshot at all.

In some cases, Newton's method can be stabilized by using successive over-relaxation, or the speed of convergence can be increased by using the same method.

Stationary point
If a stationary point of the function is encountered, the derivative is zero and the method will terminate due to division by zero.

Poor initial estimate
A large error in the initial estimate can contribute to non-convergence of the algorithm. To overcome this problem one can often linearize the function that is being optimized using calculus, logs, differentials, or even using evolutionary algorithms, such as the stochastic tunneling. Good initial estimates lie close to the final globally optimal parameter estimate. In nonlinear regression, the sum of squared errors (SSE) is only "close to" parabolic in the region of the final parameter estimates. Initial estimates found here will allow the Newton–Raphson method to quickly converge. It is only here that the Hessian matrix of the SSE is positive and the first derivative of the SSE is close to zero.

Mitigation of non-convergence
In a robust implementation of Newton's method, it is common to place limits on the number of iterations, bound the solution to an interval known to contain the root, and combine the method with a more robust root finding method.

Slow convergence for roots of multiplicity greater than 1
If the root being sought has multiplicity greater than one, the convergence rate is merely linear (errors reduced by a constant factor at each step) unless special steps are taken. When there are two or more roots that are close together then it may take many iterations before the iterates get close enough to one of them for the quadratic convergence to be apparent. However, if the multiplicity  of the root is known, the following modified algorithm preserves the quadratic convergence rate:

This is equivalent to using successive over-relaxation. On the other hand, if the multiplicity  of the root is not known, it is possible to estimate  after carrying out one or two iterations, and then use that value to increase the rate of convergence.

If the multiplicity  of the root is finite then  will have a root at the same location with multiplicity 1. In a particularly simple case, if  then  and Newton's method finds the root in a single iteration with

Analysis

If the second derivative is not 0 at  then the convergence is merely quadratic.

where

However, even linear convergence is not guaranteed in pathological situations.

In practice, these results are local, and the neighborhood of convergence is not known in advance.

Proof of quadratic convergence for Newton's iterative method

where the Lagrange form of the Taylor series expansion remainder is

Since  is the root, becomes:

Remembering that  is defined by

one finds that

That is,

Taking the absolute value of both sides gives

Equation shows that the order of convergence is at least quadratic if the following conditions are satisfied:

 ; for all , where  is the interval ;
  is continuous, for all ;
 

where M is given by

If these conditions hold,

Basins of attraction
The disjoint subsets of the basins of attraction—the regions of the real number line such that within each region iteration from any point leads to one particular root—can be infinite in number and arbitrarily small. For example, for the function , the following initial conditions are in successive basins of attraction:

{|
|||converges to||align=right|4;
|-
|||converges to||align=right|−3;
|-
|||converges to||align=right|4;
|-
|||converges to||align=right|−3;
|-
|||converges to||align=right|1.
|}

Failure analysis
Newton's method is only guaranteed to converge if certain conditions are satisfied. If the assumptions made in the proof of quadratic convergence are met, the method will converge. For the following subsections, failure of the method to converge indicates that the assumptions made in the proof were not met.

Bad starting points
In some cases the conditions on the function that are necessary for convergence are satisfied, but the point chosen as the initial point is not in the interval where the method converges. In such cases a different method, such as bisection, should be used to obtain a better estimate for the zero to use as an initial point.

Iteration point is stationary
Consider the function:

The same issue occurs if, instead of the starting point, any iteration point is stationary. Even if the derivative is small but not zero, the next iteration will be a far worse approximation.

Starting point enters a cycle

For some functions, some starting points may enter an infinite cycle, preventing convergence. Let

and take 0 as the starting point. The first iteration produces 1 and the second iteration returns to 0 so the sequence will alternate between the two without converging to a root. In fact, this 2-cycle is stable: there are neighborhoods around 0 and around 1 from which all points iterate asymptotically to the 2-cycle (and hence not to the root of the function). In general, the behavior of the sequence can be very complex (see Newton fractal). The real solution of this equation is ….

Derivative issues
If the function is not continuously differentiable in a neighborhood of the root then it is possible that Newton's method will always diverge and fail, unless the solution is guessed on the first try.

Derivative does not exist at root
A simple example of a function where Newton's method diverges is trying to find the cube root of zero.

For any iteration point , the next iteration point will be:

The algorithm overshoots the solution and lands on the other side of the -axis, farther away than it initially was; applying Newton's method actually doubles the distances from the solution at each iteration.

In fact, the iterations diverge to infinity for every , where .

Discontinuous derivative
If the derivative is not continuous at the root, then convergence may fail to occur in any neighborhood of the root. Consider the function

Its derivative is:

So  is unbounded near the root, and Newton's method will diverge almost everywhere in any neighborhood of it, even though:
the function is differentiable (and thus continuous) everywhere;
the derivative at the root is nonzero;
 is infinitely differentiable except at the root; and
the derivative is bounded in a neighborhood of the root (unlike ).

Non-quadratic convergence
In some cases the iterates converge but do not converge as quickly as promised. In these cases simpler methods converge just as quickly as Newton's method.

Zero derivative
If the first derivative is zero at the root, then convergence will not be quadratic. Let

then  and consequently

So convergence is not quadratic, even though the function is infinitely differentiable everywhere.

Similar problems occur even when the root is only "nearly" double. For example, let

 = 1
 = …
 = …
 = …
 = …
 = …
 = …
 = …
it takes six iterations to reach a point where the convergence appears to be quadratic.

No second derivative
If there is no second derivative at the root, then convergence may fail to be quadratic. Let

Then

And

except when  where it is undefined. Given ,

which has approximately  times as many bits of precision as  has. This is less than the 2 times as many which would be required for quadratic convergence.

Generalizations

Complex functions

When dealing with complex functions, Newton's method can be directly applied to find their zeroes. Each zero has a basin of attraction in the complex plane, the set of all starting values that cause the method to converge to that particular zero. These sets can be mapped as in the image shown. For many complex functions, the boundaries of the basins of attraction are fractals.

In some cases there are regions in the complex plane which are not in any of these basins of attraction, meaning the iterates do not converge. In this case almost all real initial conditions lead to chaotic behavior, while some initial conditions iterate either to infinity or to repeating cycles of any finite length.

Curt McMullen has shown that for any possible purely iterative algorithm similar to Newton's method, the algorithm will diverge on some open regions of the complex plane when applied to some polynomial of degree 4 or higher. However, McMullen gave a generally convergent algorithm for polynomials of degree 3.

Chebyshev's third-order method

Nash–Moser iteration

Systems of equations

variables,  functions
One may also use Newton's method to solve systems of  equations, which amounts to finding the (simultaneous) zeroes of  continuously differentiable functions  This is equivalent to finding the zeroes of a single vector-valued function  In the formulation given above, the scalars  are replaced by vectors  and instead of dividing the function  by its derivative  one instead has to left multiply the function  by the inverse of its  Jacobian matrix . This results in the expression

.

Rather than actually computing the inverse of the Jacobian matrix, one may save time and increase numerical stability by solving the system of linear equations

for the unknown .

variables,  equations, with 
If the nonlinear system has no solution, the method attempts to find a solution in the non-linear least squares sense. See Gauss–Newton algorithm for more information.

In a Banach space
Another generalization is Newton's method to find a root of a functional  defined in a Banach space. In this case the formulation is

One needs the Fréchet derivative to be boundedly invertible at each  in order for the method to be applicable. A condition for existence of and convergence to a root is given by the Newton–Kantorovich theorem.

Over -adic numbers
In -adic analysis, the standard method to show a polynomial equation in one variable has a -adic root is Hensel's lemma, which uses the recursion from Newton's method on the -adic numbers. Because of the more stable behavior of addition and multiplication in the -adic numbers compared to the real numbers (specifically, the unit ball in the -adics is a ring), convergence in Hensel's lemma can be guaranteed under much simpler hypotheses than in the classical Newton's method on the real line.

Newton–Fourier method

The Newton–Fourier method is Joseph Fourier's extension of Newton's method to provide bounds on the absolute error of the root approximation, while still providing quadratic convergence.

This guarantees that there is a unique root on this interval, call it . If it is concave down instead of concave up then replace  by  since they have the same roots.

Let  be the right endpoint of the interval and let  be the left endpoint of the interval. Given , define

which is just Newton's method as before. Then define

The iterations  will be strictly decreasing to the root while the iterations  will be strictly increasing to the root. Also,

Quasi-Newton methods
When the Jacobian is unavailable or too expensive to compute at every iteration, a quasi-Newton method can be used.

-analog
Newton's method can be generalized with the -analog of the usual derivative.

Modified Newton methods

Maehly's procedure
A nonlinear equation has multiple solutions in general. But if the initial value is not appropriate, Newton's method may not converge to the desired solution or may converge to the same solution found earlier.

This method is applied to obtain zeros of the Bessel function of the second kind.

Hirano's modified Newton method
Hirano's modified Newton method is a modification conserving the convergence of Newton method and avoiding unstableness. It is developed to solve complex polynomials.

Interval Newton's method

Combining Newton's method with interval arithmetic is very useful in some contexts. This provides a stopping criterion that is more reliable than the usual ones (which are a small value of the function or a small variation of the variable between consecutive iterations). Also, this may detect cases where Newton's method converges theoretically but diverges numerically because of an insufficient floating-point precision (this is typically the case for polynomials of large degree, where a very small change of the variable may change dramatically the value of the function; see Wilkinson's polynomial).

 
We then define the interval Newton operator by:

 

where . Note that the hypothesis on  implies that  is well defined and is an interval (see interval arithmetic for further details on interval operations). This naturally leads to the following sequence:
 

Applications

Minimization and maximization problems

Newton's method can be used to find a minimum or maximum of a function . The derivative is zero at a minimum or maximum, so local minima and maxima can be found by applying Newton's method to the derivative. The iteration becomes:

Multiplicative inverses of numbers and power series
An important application is Newton–Raphson division, which can be used to quickly find the reciprocal of a number , using only multiplication and subtraction, that is to say the number  such that . We have .

Newton's iteration is

Therefore, Newton's iteration needs only two multiplications and one subtraction.

This method is also very efficient to compute the multiplicative inverse of a power series.

Solving transcendental equations
Many transcendental equations can be solved using Newton's method. Given the equation

Obtaining zeros of special functions
Newton's method is applied to the ratio of Bessel functions in order to obtain its root.

Numerical verification for solutions of nonlinear equations
A numerical verification for solutions of nonlinear equations has been established by using Newton's method multiple times and forming a set of solution candidates.

Examples

Square root
Consider the problem of finding the square root of a number , that is to say the positive number  such that . Newton's method is one of many methods of computing square roots. We have .

For example, for finding the square root of 612 with an initial guess , the sequence given by Newton's method is:

where the correct digits are underlined. With only a few iterations one can obtain a solution accurate to many decimal places.

Rearranging the formula as follows yields the Babylonian method of finding square roots:

Solution of  
We have .

For example, with an initial guess , the sequence given by Newton's method is (note that a starting value of 0 will lead to an undefined result, showing the importance of using a starting point that is close to the solution):

The correct digits are underlined in the above example. In particular,  is correct to 12 decimal places. We see that the number of correct digits after the decimal point increases from 2 (for ) to 5 and 10, illustrating the quadratic convergence.

Code
The following is an implementation example of the Newton's method in the Python (version 3.x) programming language for finding a root of a function f which has derivative f_prime.

The initial guess will be  and the function will be  so that .

Each new iteration of Newton's method will be denoted by x1. We will check during the computation whether the denominator (yprime) becomes too small (smaller than epsilon), which would be the case if , since otherwise a large amount of error could be introduced. def f(x):             
	return x**2 - 2   # f(x) = x^2 - 2

def f_prime(x):
	return 2*x        # f'(x) = 2x

def newtons_method(
    x0,               # The initial guess
    f,                # The function whose root we are trying to find
    f_prime,          # The derivative of the function
    tolerance,        # 7-digit accuracy is desired
    epsilon,          # Do not divide by a number smaller than this
    max_iterations,   # The maximum number of iterations to execute
    ):
    for i in range(max_iterations):
        y = f(x0)
        yprime = f_prime(x0)

        if abs(yprime) < epsilon:       # Stop if the denominator is too small
            break

        x1 = x0 - y / yprime            # Do Newton's computation

        if abs(x1 - x0) <= tolerance:   # Stop when the result is within the desired tolerance
            return x1                   # x1 is a solution within tolerance and maximum number of iterations

        x0 = x1                         # Update x0 to start the process again

    return None                         # Newton's method did not converge

See also

 Aitken's delta-squared process
 Bisection method
 Euler method
 Fast inverse square root
 Fisher scoring
 Gradient descent
 Integer square root
 Kantorovich theorem
 Laguerre's method
 Methods of computing square roots
 Newton's method in optimization
 Richardson extrapolation
 Root-finding algorithm
 Secant method
 Steffensen's method
 Subgradient method

Notes

References

Further reading
 Kendall E. Atkinson, An Introduction to Numerical Analysis, (1989) John Wiley & Sons, Inc, 
 Tjalling J. Ypma, Historical development of the Newton–Raphson method, SIAM Review 37 (4), 531–551, 1995. .
 
 P. Deuflhard, Newton Methods for Nonlinear Problems. Affine Invariance and Adaptive Algorithms. Springer Series in Computational Mathematics, Vol. 35. Springer, Berlin, 2004. .
 C. T. Kelley, Solving Nonlinear Equations with Newton's Method, no 1 in Fundamentals of Algorithms, SIAM, 2003. .
 J. M. Ortega, W. C. Rheinboldt, Iterative Solution of Nonlinear Equations in Several Variables. Classics in Applied Mathematics, SIAM, 2000. .
. See especially Sections 9.4, 9.6, and 9.7.

External links

 

Newton's method, Citizendium.
Mathews, J., The Accelerated and Modified Newton Methods, Course notes.
Wu, X., Roots of Equations, Course notes.

Optimization algorithms and methods
Root-finding algorithms
Isaac Newton